Darrent Demarcus Williams (September 27, 1982 – January 1, 2007) was an American football player for the Denver Broncos of the National Football League. After attending high school in Fort Worth, Texas, Williams played football at Oklahoma State University. He was a second-round draft pick by the Broncos in 2005. Williams was killed in a drive-by shooting the day after he finished his second season with the Broncos.

High school
Born on Monday, September 27, 1982, and raised in Fort Worth, Texas, Williams attended O. D. Wyatt High School, where he played cornerback and was also a punt returner. As a senior, he was named 7-4A Defensive Most Valuable Player after posting five interceptions that featured several long returns, including a best of 54 yards. As a punt returner, Williams averaged 30 yards per return with four touchdowns.

Williams received little recruiting attention during high school, receiving offers only from Texas Christian University, Louisiana Tech University and Oklahoma State University. Reportedly, he was the last player signed of the 2001 class, and was only signed after an OSU coach's wife urged her husband to evaluate his talent further, as she was his school counselor.

College
Williams played college football for Oklahoma State University. He played ten games his first year, becoming a starter during the second half of the season. In Williams' freshman year, he returned two interceptions for touchdowns against Baylor. During the post-game press-conference, it was revealed that he had predicted he would do this in a statement to then head coach, Les Miles. As a sophomore, Williams started all of the team's thirteen games, recording 53 tackles and three interceptions, while breaking up 13 passes.

During his junior year, Williams continued to start for the Cowboys. He posted 66 tackles and six interceptions (third in the Big 12 Conference). He also broke up 17 passes. His junior-year performance earned him first-team All-Big 12 Conference honors.

Williams' played in only seven games in his last year at Oklahoma State. He missed the last three games because of injury and was limited before that because of an arm injury. Still, Williams totaled 21 tackles (18 solo), three pass breakups, two forced fumbles and one fumble recovery, which he returned 53 yards. Williams finished his collegiate career tied for first place all-time in Division I college football in career interception returns for touchdowns. He had 11 career interceptions and scored 9 touchdowns on returns (5 interception returns, 3 punt returns and 1 blocked extra point return).

Professional career

2005 NFL Combine

Williams was selected by the Denver Broncos in the second round (56th overall) in the 2005 NFL Draft. He recorded his first career interception on November 13, 2005 versus the Oakland Raiders. The Raiders were driving to score, when quarterback Kerry Collins attempted a pass to wide receiver Jerry Porter. Williams jumped the route, intercepted the ball and took it 82 yards for the touchdown. The Broncos won the game, 31–17.

Williams established himself as the Broncos' starting cornerback, recording 58 tackles and two interceptions. He also led the Broncos in punt and kick returns. His nine starts at cornerback in 2005 were the most for a Broncos rookie at that position since Louis Wright started 11 games in 1975. An injury kept Williams out of the Broncos' lineup for the last three games of the season. Williams was recognized as a first-team All-Rookie selection by Pro Football Weekly and the Pro Football Writers Association.

Williams played in 15 games during the 2006 season, recording 86 tackles (77 solo) and four interceptions (returning one for a touchdown), as well as serving as the team's primary punt returner. His last game was a season-ending home loss to the San Francisco 49ers. In that game, played mere hours before his death, Williams had three tackles and returned two punts for 50 yards before leaving the game with a shoulder injury late in the second half.

For his career, Williams had 1 sack, 2 forced fumbles, 6 interceptions, and 2 touchdowns.

Death
On Monday, January 1, 2007, Williams was killed during a drive-by shooting at approximately 2:10 AM (09:10 GMT). Williams and two other passengers were shot when another vehicle pulled beside his rented Hummer H2 limousine in downtown Denver, Colorado. The shooting occurred near 11th Ave. and Speer Blvd. The shooting happened less than 12 hours after the Broncos played their final game of the 2006 season against the San Francisco 49ers in Denver.

Williams had been attending a New Year's Eve party and birthday party held for and by Denver Nuggets player Kenyon Martin at a nightclub, Shelter. The Denver Police Department reported that the shooting was preceded by some type of altercation or argument at the nightclub between Crips gang members and other patrons, one of whom was Broncos teammate Brandon Marshall. A police spokesman said, "There was some confrontation between a group of people in the vehicle and a group at the nightclub."<ref name="postdeath">City, team, kin reel from brutal killing The Denver Post. January 1, 2007.</ref> Williams was not involved in the altercation. Marshall was "one of the instigators of the fight" according to a report by ESPN.

According to the county coroner's office, Williams sustained a single gunshot wound to the neck, killing him almost instantly.Prosecutor: Disrespected gang member killed Darrent Williams Associated Press. After Williams was shot, he fell in the lap of Broncos teammate Javon Walker. He was pronounced dead around 2:30 AM (09:30 GMT). The two other passengers injured in the shooting were both released from the hospital the day after.

Aftermath

The Denver police impounded a vehicle in connection with the shooting. The vehicle was registered to Brian Hicks, a 28-year-old Crips gang member, who was already incarcerated awaiting trial for attempted murder and drug charges.  Associates of Hicks were questioned as potential material witnesses to the Williams shooting. Although Williams is from the Carter Park neighborhood in South Fort Worth that associates with the Crips, rumors persist that it was a gang-related event because many club-goers have attested to seeing Williams along with members of his group showing Bloods gang signs and verbally representing Bloods; however, there has not been any concrete evidence to suggest that. Williams' family and teammates also say that the scenario was untrue. 

Williams was survived by his seven-year-old son, four-year-old daughter and 24-year-old girlfriend, all of whom live in Fort Worth, Texas. A memorial fund was set up in their name. Denver Nuggets players Carmelo Anthony and Kenyon Martin, who were with Williams at the nightclub the evening of the shooting, planned to honor their friend by possibly setting up a college fund for Williams' children. A fan-constructed memorial was formed on the southern wall of the fountain in front of Invesco Field at Mile High. Javon Walker decided to wear his hair in a "fro-hawk", in honor of Williams, who wore his hair in a similar way as a trademark.

On May 29, 2008, the Darrent Williams Memorial Teen Center was opened at the Denver Broncos Branch of Boys & Girls Clubs of Metro Denver.

On May 30, 2008, the Rocky Mountain News'' published a story claiming that it had obtained a signed confession letter by Crips gang member Willie D. Clark, in which he admitted to firing the shot that killed Williams.

See also 
 List of sportspeople who died during their careers

References

External links
 The Official Darrent Williams Memorial MySpace Page
 Sports E-Cyclopedia's Memorium to Darrent Williams

1982 births
2007 deaths
2007 murders in the United States
Players of American football from Fort Worth, Texas
American football cornerbacks
Denver Broncos players
Oklahoma State Cowboys football players
Male murder victims
Murdered African-American people
People murdered in Colorado
Deaths by firearm in Colorado
People murdered by African-American organized crime
Burials in Texas